Dave Harrington is the name of:
 Dave Harrington (musician) (born 1985), multi-instrumentalist, producer and one half of the electronic music duo Darkside
 Dave Harrington (darts player) (born 1953), darts player from New Zealand